Samuel James Turner (born 30 August 1993) is an English professional footballer who plays in Sweden for Ånge IF, as a right back, right winger and forward.

Career
Born in Lincoln, Turner made his debut for hometown club Lincoln City on 9 October 2010, in a Football League match against Macclesfield Town. He left the club following the end of the 2010–11 season, having made two appearances for them in the Football League, to join local non-league club Lincoln Moorlands Railway.

In April 2013 he joined Swedish club Ånge IF.

Playing style
After primarily playing in England as a right winger and forward, Turner began to play more as a right back when he moved to Sweden.

Career statistics

References

1993 births
Living people
English footballers
Lincoln City F.C. players
English Football League players
Association football wingers
Association football fullbacks
Association football forwards
Lincoln Moorlands Railway F.C. players
English expatriate footballers
Expatriate footballers in Sweden
English expatriate sportspeople in Sweden
Ånge IF players